The flag of Rotterdam, the second-largest city in the Netherlands, was adopted 10 February 1949. It is a horizontal triband of green-white-green. This colour combination is also found in the coat of arms of Rotterdam. The ratio is 2:3. 

The green and white colours have been used to represent the city since the Middle Ages, but the employment of the flag of Rotterdam has varied greatly. The green refers to the Court of Wena and the white symbolises the Rotte river.

Historical flags 
The colors green and white have been the colors of Rotterdam since the Middle Ages, but the number of stripes on Rotterdam flags varied greatly. The green refers to the Court of Wena and the white symbolizes the Rotte.  Ships with Rotterdam as their home port flew the Rotterdam flag in one or two masts at sea.

References
Flags of the World

Flag of Rotterdam
Rotterdam
Flags introduced in 1949